Dmitry Giorgievitch Shervashidze, or Umar Bey Chachba, was briefly the Prince of Abkhazia in 1821–1822. He was a colonel in the Russian army. He converted to Christianity and was baptised into the Orthodox faith under the name of Dmitry.

He succeeded as the Prince of Abkhazia on the death of his father, February 7 (or November 13) 1821. He was poisoned at Lykhny by Urus Lakoba, October 16, 1822.

Ancestry

References

1822 deaths
Abkhazian former Muslims
Princes of Abkhazia
Converts to Eastern Orthodoxy from Islam
House of Shervashidze